The Saint-Jean-Baptiste Church is a church in Ampoigné, Mayenne, France.

Structure 

It has buttresses in red sandstone.

References

External links 

Churches in Mayenne
Roman Catholic churches in France